Astrococcus is a genus of plant of the family Euphorbiaceae first described as a genus in 1854. It contains only one known species, Astrococcus cornutus, native to neighboring states of identical names, Amazonas State in southern Venezuela and Amazonas State in northwestern Brazil.

Species formerly included
moved to Haematostemon 
Astrococcus coriaceus Baill., synonym of Haematostemon coriaceus (Baill.) Pax & K.Hoffm.

References

Plukenetieae
Flora of the Amazon
Monotypic Euphorbiaceae genera